Notre Dame de la Salette or Notre-Dame-de-la-Salette can refer to:

 Notre-Dame-de-la-Salette, Quebec, a municipality in Canada
 Notre-Dame-de-la-Salette, Paris, a church in France
 Our Lady of La Salette (French: Notre-Dame de La Salette), a Marian apparition